The London Review of Books (LRB) is a British literary magazine published twice monthly that features articles and essays on fiction and non-fiction subjects, which are usually structured as book reviews.

History
The London Review of Books was founded in 1979, when publication of The Times Literary Supplement was suspended during the year-long lock-out at The Times. Its founding editors were Karl Miller, then professor of English at University College London; Mary-Kay Wilmers, formerly an editor at The Times Literary Supplement; and Susannah Clapp, a former editor at Jonathan Cape. For its first six months, it appeared as an insert in The New York Review of Books. It became an independent publication in May 1980. Its political stance has been described by Alan Bennett, a prominent contributor, as "consistently radical".

Unlike The Times Literary Supplement (TLS), the majority of the articles the LRB publishes (usually fifteen per issue) are long essays. Some articles in each issue are not based on books, while several short articles discuss film or exhibitions. Political and social essays are frequent. The magazine is headquartered in Bloomsbury, London.

Wilmers took over as editor in 1992 and remained as editor for almost 30 years. She was succeeded by Jean McNicol and Alice Spawls in 2021. Average circulation per issue for 2018 was 75,700.

In January 2010, The Times wrote that the London Review was £27M in debt to the Wilmers' family trust, although the trust had "no intention of the lender seeking repayment of the loan in the near future".

In 2011, when Pankaj Mishra criticised Niall Ferguson's book Civilisation: The West and the Rest in the LRB, Ferguson threatened to sue for libel.

The London Review Bookshop opened in Bloomsbury in May 2003, and the Cake Shop next door in November 2007. The bookshop is used as a venue for author presentations and discussions.

Contributors
Contributors have included:

See also
 Literary criticism

References

Further reading
 Elizabeth Day, "Is the LRB the best magazine in the world?". The Guardian, 9 March 2014. Retrieved 10 March 2014.

External links
 
 London Review Bookshop

Biweekly magazines published in the United Kingdom
Book review magazines
Literary magazines published in the United Kingdom
Magazines established in 1979
Magazines published in London
Political magazines published in the United Kingdom
The New York Review of Books